Bela koeneni is an extinct species of sea snail, a marine gastropod mollusk in the family Mangeliidae.

Description

Distribution
This extinct marine species was found in Rupélien strata in Aquitaine, France.

References

 Cossmann (M.) & Lambert (J.), 1884 - Etude paléontologique et stratigraphique sur le terrain oligocène marin aux environs d'Etampes. Mémoires de la Société Géologique de France, t. 3, vol. 3, p. 1-187
  Kantor (Y.), Lozouet (P.), Puillandre (N.) & Bouchet (P.), 2014 - Lost and found: The Eocene family Pyramimitridae (Neogastropoda) discovered in the Recent fauna of the Indo-Pacific. Zootaxa, t. 3754, vol. 3, p. 239-276
 Lozouet P. (2015). Nouvelles espèces de gastéropodes (Mollusca: Gastropoda) de l'Oligocène et du Miocène inférieur d'Aquitaine (Sud-Ouest de la France). Partie 5. Cossmanniana. 17: 15-84

External links
 Image of Bela koeneni
 Muséum nationale d'Histoire Naturelle : Bela koeneni

koeneni